Anaana’s Tent (Anaanaup Tupinga) is a Canadian pre-school children’s television show created by Taqqut Productions in 2018. It airs in Canada on APTN in both Inuktitut and English. It is hosted by Rita Claire Mike-Murphy along with her puppet husky sidekick Qimmiq.

Format 
Each episode is approximately 22 minutes long and features a combination of live-action, puppet and animated sequences. These segments contain a variety of content, including songs, stories and educational sketches. Each of the elements in an episode focus on the title theme.

Characters
  is spending the summer at her anaana's tent with her husky, Qimmiq. While Anaana is out on the land, Rita Claire stays in her tent and plays games, sings songs, reads stories, and learns new words in Inuktitut. Rita Claire’s full name is Rita Claire Mike-Murphy, who also sings under the name Riit.
  is Rita Claire's husky. He is a retired sled dog. Qimmiq can be grumpy sometimes, but when he is in a good mood, he can be fun and helpful. He helps Rita Claire to count, sort, and learn new words.

Recurring characters
  is an Arctic hare with a lot of energy. He loves to play and learn about the world around him, but he’s a little impatient. Sometimes he doesn’t think things through. He’s always up for an adventure around town and out on the land with his pal Kalla. Kalla and Ukaliq most commonly appear in segments in which they help a narrator list works that begin with one of the sounds in the Inuktitut language. Ukaliq is voiced by Vinnie Karetak.
  is a wise and calm little lemming. Kalla is patient and thoughtful like many traditional hunters who live in the Arctic. He is a good friend to Ukaliq. When they go on adventures, Kalla teaches Ukaliq traditional skills and reminds him to stay calm. Kalla and Ukaliq most commonly appear in segments in which they help a narrator list works that begin with one of the sounds in the Inuktitut language. Kalla is voiced by Anguti Johnston.
  is an animated character who loves animals and wants to share everything he knows about them with his friends. He hosts a segment titled “Uliaq’s Amazing Animals” in which he discusses a specific arctic animal, teaching viewers about it.
  is a big polar bear who know what it means to be a good friend. Nanuq likes to stay active by playing hockey and often has to find creative ways to cheer up  his little brother Nuka. He and Nuka appear in the segments "Nanuq and Nuka".
  is a little polar bear with a grumpy exterior but, deep down, he just wants to have fun with his friends. Nuka is a persistent bear who doesn’t give up when he sets his mind to something. He and Nanuq appear in the segments "Nanuq and Nuka".

Episodes

Season 1 (2018)

Each episode is credited to all directors Nadia Mike, Roselynn Akulujuk, Neil Christopher, Philip Eddolls, Danny Christopher and Patrick Béland.

Each episode is credited to the same writers; head writer Neil Christopher and writers Nadia Mike, Roselynn Akulukjuk, Danny Christopher, William Flaherty, Maren Vsetula, Champagne Brittany Choquer, Philip Eddolls and Martha Grant.

Season 2 (2020)

Each episode is credited to all directors Roselynn Akulukjuk, Anguti Johnston, Mark Aspland, Neil Christopher and Daniel Christopher.

Each episode is credited to the same writers; head writer Neil Christopher and writers Nadia Mike, Nadia Sammurtok, Neil Christopher, Bronwyn Szabo, Ali Hinch, Philip Eddolls and Amelia Spedaliere.

Release
The first season was aired on APTN. The season ran in Inuktitut starting May 12, 2018. It was then aired on APTN in English starting September 15, 2018. All episodes are currently available to watch in both languages on the APTN kids website.

The second season originally aired on APTN. The season began in Inuktitut starting February 15, 2020. It was then aired on APTN in English starting May 17, 2020.

As of 2020, the show is available for streaming in Canada on APTN Lumi, CBC Gem and IsumaTV.

References

External links
 
 

2010s Canadian children's television series
2020s Canadian children's television series
2010s preschool education television series
2020s preschool education television series
2018 Canadian television series debuts
Canadian children's musical television series
Canadian preschool education television series
Canadian television series with live action and animation
Canadian television shows featuring puppetry
Inuktitut
Aboriginal Peoples Television Network original programming
Inuit television series